Dobrevtsi may refer to the following places in Bulgaria:

Dobrevtsi, Gabrovo Province
Dobrevtsi, Lovech Province
Dobrevtsi, Veliko Tarnovo Province